Events in the year 2022 in France

Incumbents
President – Emmanuel Macron (REM)
Prime Minister – Jean Castex (REM) until May 16, Élisabeth Borne (REM) from May 16
Government – Borne government

Events
Ongoing — COVID-19 pandemic in France

February
 14 February - Saint-Laurent-de-la-Salanque explosion

March
 9 March - 2022 Corsica unrest
 20 March - 2022 Wallis and Futuna Territorial Assembly election, 2022 Saint Barthélemy Territorial Council election, 2022 Saint Martin Territorial Council election, 2022 Saint Pierre and Miquelon legislative election

April
 10 April - The first round of the 2022 French presidential election is held.
 24 April - The second round of the 2022 French presidential election is held and incumbent president Emmanuel Macron is reelected, defeating  Marine Le Pen.

May
 16 May - Prime minister Jean Castex resigns and president Macron appoints Minister of Labour, Employment and Economic Inclusion Élisabeth Borne to replace him.

June
 2022 French legislative election

July
 12 July onwards - 2022 Gironde wildfires

November
 3 November - during the government question period, National Rally deputy Grégoire de Fournas interrupts Black deputy Carlos Martens Bilongo's remarks on the situation of migrants on the SOS Méditerranée ship Ocean Viking, shouting "go back to Africa!" De Fournas's outburst was deemed racist, though it was unclear whether he was referring to Bilongo or the African migrants. The president of the National Assembly suspended parliament. De Fournas received a 15-day ban from the National Assembly and had his pay docked.
 5 November - Jordan Bardella is elected president of National Rally, ending Le Pen era as president of the party.

December
 Singer Lissandro wins the Junior Eurovision Song Contest 2022 in Yerevan, Armenia, performing the song "Oh maman!"
 Éric Ciotti is elected president of the Republicans.
 23 December - 2022 Paris shooting

Deaths

January
1 January
Roger-Xavier Lantéri, journalist (b. 1930)
Pierre Parsus, painter and illustrator (b. 1921)
Jean-Charles Terrassier, French psychologist. (b. 1940)
3 January
Igor Bogdanoff, television presenter and academic fraudster (Bogdanov affair) (b. 1942)
Daniel Colliard, French politician, deputy (1993–1997). (b. 1930)
Claude Taittinger, businessman, director of Taittinger (b. 1927)
5 January – Anatole Novak, road bicycle racer (b. 1937)
7 January – José Évrard, politician, deputy (b. 1945)

March
 17 March – Jean-Pierre Demailly, mathematician (b. 1957)

May
 29 May – Ariel Besse, actress (b. 1965)

August
 11 August – Jean-Jacques Sempé, cartoonist (Le Petit Nicolas) (b. 1932)

See also

Country overviews
 History of France
 History of modern France
 Outline of France
 Government of France
 Politics of France
 Years in France
 Timeline of France history
 List of French films of 2022

Related timelines for current period
 2022

References

 
France
France
2020s in France
Years of the 21st century in France